Anatol Plugaru (born 1951 in Florești District) is a politician and lawyer from Republic of Moldova who was Minister of Defence in 1991–1992. He was one of the signers of Declaration of Independence of Republic of Moldova on 27 August 1991.

References

1951 births
Living people
Moldovan Ministers of Defense
People from Florești District
Date of birth missing (living people)
Moldovan lawyers
20th-century Moldovan politicians